Yamaha Pacifica is the name of a series of electric guitars manufactured by Yamaha.  The line was originally designed in Yamaha's California custom-shop by Rich Lasner, working with guitar builder Leo Knapp.  Initially intended by Lasner and Knapp as a test project, Yamaha Japan chose to produce the instruments.

Many variants of the Pacifica have been produced since the 1990s, including models styled like the Fender Stratocaster and Telecaster, twelve string models, carved-top and set-neck versions.

Models 

Pacificas all have one of two basic body shapes: a Stratocaster inspired double cutaway shape, or a Telecaster-like single cutaway.  Apart from these similarities, the models vary in materials, hardware, and electronics. As of December 2009, there were currently 5 models in production.

The best-selling and most recognisable models are the entry-level PAC012 and PAC112. The 112 has a solid Alder body and has always been available with a clear varnish finish, showing the grain of the wood. At the time of the original launch this guitar was intended to compete with some of Fender's budget models. The entry level PAC012 has one Yamaha humbucker and two single coil pickups, an agathis body and a Strat-style vibrato bridge.

The early PAC1412 and PAC1421 models had set necks and carved tops with Floyd Rose locking vibrato bridges.  These guitars were ultimately too costly to produce and hence too expensive for Yamaha's market.
Other variations include the twelve-string PAC303 12, and the reversed headstock PAC721R.

The high-end PAC1511MS has a solid swamp ash body, with a Seymour Duncan humbucker  neck pickup, and a Seymour Duncan "hot-rails" humbucker pickup in the bridge position, and a non-vibrato bridge with strings passing through the body. A more affordable version of the Mike Stern signature model Pacifica is the PAC311MS. Both are Telecaster-style guitars similar in shape, but in the case of the PAC311MS controls are slanted rather than on a chrome plate parallel to the strings and the M stands for Maple (neck) and the S for Singlecut as there also was a PAC311S  with a rosewood neck. The 311MS and 311S were released in 1998 and production lasted only a couple of years. The 1511MS, however, remains in production. This illustrates how some Pacificas were lower or higher priced versions of conceptually similar guitars.

The 904 model featured a Warmoth produced neck with a compound radius, locking Sperzel machineheads, and a push-push tone control (like the 604W and 604V) that split the front dual single coil pickup into a single one. The Body was an ash slab top on an alder back and featured a highly engineered neck joint.

At the 2011 Frankfurt Musikmesse Yamaha announced the 611HFM, 510V and 311H models and the reintroduction of the 120H.
The 120H is similar to the 112V, but features a hardtail, instead of a tremolo bridge, and a pair of humbucker pickups.

Endorsers of the Pacifica guitars include Michael Lee Firkins and Mike Stern. The Mike Stern signature guitar is the PAC1511MS.

Model Numbers 
E.G.
PAC112V

PAC - Identifies the series the guitar belongs to: PAC = Pacifica
112 - Identifies how “high end” the guitar is: 1 indicates basic parts, but an alder body
112 - Identifies how many humbuckers the guitar has (one by the bridge)
112 - Identifies how many single coils the guitar has (one at the neck; one in the middle)
V - Indicates other features: indicates the guitar is equipped with alnico-V pickups.

The first number loosely refers to the class/features of the guitar:
0 = Agathis
1 = Alder
2 = Alder, 2 Pc
3 = Alder, 2 Pc, Better Hardware
4 = Alder, 2 Pc, Better Hardware (Similar to 3?)
5 = Alder, 2 Pc, Better Hardware, Better Contours
6 = Alder, 2 Pc, Better Hardware, Better Contours, Aftermarket Pickups
7 = Alder, 1 Pc, Better Hardware, Better Contours, Aftermarket Pickups
8 = Alder, 1 Pc, Better Hardware, TANJ (Total Access Neck Joint), Aftermarket Pickups
9 = Alder, 1 Pc, Better Hardware, TANJ, SD Pickups, MIA, Warmoth Neck
10 = N/A
11 = N/A
12 = Alder, 1 Pc, Better Hardware, TANJ, SD Pickups, MIA, Set Neck
13 = N/A
14 = Alder, 1 Pc, Better Hardware, TANJ, SD Pickups, MIA, Neck-Thru
15 = (1511 Mike Stern Model)

Other Features:
J = Rosewood Fretboard (where Bubinga is also used)
V = Alnico-V pickups (2nd Generation Pacifica)
S = Single cut
W = Wilkinson tremolo 
H = Hardtail (2nd Generation)
D = Alternative Body Shape
FM = Flamed Maple
QM = Quilted Maple
CX = Fancy Pick-guard
X = Ltd. Edition Yellow Satin
CP = Ltd. Edition Mirror Pick-guard and Decals
L = Left Handed
R = Reverse Headstock
MS = Maple Singlecut (311MS) or Mike Stern Model (1511MS,1611MS)
USA 1 = 1st line of MIA models
USA 2 = 2nd line of MIA models
-12 = 12 String

Numbering information from:

See also
 Yamaha electric guitar models
 Fender Stratocaster

External links

 Yamaha Pacifica PAC311MS

References

Pacifica